is a soccer game for the Nintendo 64. It was released only in Japan in 1999. The game has officially licensed players and teams from Japan's J-League.

1999 video games
ASCII Corporation games
J.League licensed video games
Japan-exclusive video games
Nintendo 64 games
Nintendo 64-only games
Video games developed in Japan